Monte Conner is a former senior vice president of A&R for Roadrunner Records. He started at Roadrunner in December 1987. He has worked with numerous bands, including Slipknot, Trivium and King Diamond.

The bands he has signed, in alphabetical order, are:
Amen, Annihilator, Artillery, Atrocity, Atrophy, Believer, Biohazard, Both Worlds, Brujeria, Buzzov-en, Jerry Cantrell, Keith Caputo, Cavalera Conspiracy, Chimaira, CKY, Coal Chamber, Cynic, Dååth, Death, Deicide, Defiance, DevilDriver, Dirty Americans, Disincarnate, Dommin, Downthesun, Earth Crisis, Exhorder, Fear Factory, Floodgate, Glassjaw, Gojira, Gorguts, Gruntruck, Heathen, Immolation, Kinetic Dissent, Last Crack, Leadfoot, Life Of Agony, Machine Head, Malevolent Creation, Murderdolls, Nailbomb, Obituary, Optimum Wound Profile, Pestilence, Porcupine Tree, Powersurge, Realm, Revoker, Rush, Sadus, Sanctity, Sepultura, Shank 456, Skin Chamber, Slipknot, Solitude Aeturnus, Sorrow, Soulfly, Spineshank, Star Star, Stone Sour, Storm Corrosion, Suffocation, Taking Dawn, 36 Crazyfists, Times of Grace, To My Surprise, Toyshop, Treponem Pal, Trivium, Type O Negative, Wednesday 13, Willard, The Workhorse Movement

In addition, Conner initiated the following licensing deals for Roadrunner outside North America: 
Acid Bath, Divine Heresy, Hatebreed, Heaven & Hell, Glen Hughes, Karma to Burn, Periphery, Queens of the Stone Age, Satyricon, Sevendust, Shadows Fall

He also brought in the following label deals to Roadrunner outside North America: 
Energy Rekords, Ferret Records, Soundfront Records, Trustkill Records

His licensed catalogue records include the following bands for Roadrunner U.S.:
Angelwitch, Budgie, Destruction, Entombed, Hitmann, Gary Moore, Motörhead, Raven, Razor, Saint Vitus, Sodom, Uriah Heep

Conner conceived of and oversaw the Roadrunner United album and live DVD, compiled the MTV2 Headbangers Ball CD series and various compilations and soundtracks, oversees all Roadrunner's catalogue reissues and remasters, A&R's Dream Theater, Killswitch Engage, Korn, Nightwish and Opeth, as well as assists with various Loud & Proud imprint projects including Lynyrd Skynyrd, The Steve Miller Band, Kenny Wayne Shepherd, Rob Zombie.

Past artists Conner has also A&R’ed but did not sign include: Chastain, Front Line Assembly, Holy Terror, The Great Kat, King Diamond, Shelter, Toxik, Whiplash.

Monte co-hosts a bi-annual radio show, Graybeard Roots, on Sirius/XM Satellite Radio.

Connor left Roadrunner on August 2, 2012, after much turnover at the label. On August 16, 2012, it was announced that Connor would be partnering with Nuclear Blast Records.

Discography 
Annihilator - Alice in Hell
Annihilator - Set the World on Fire
Artillery - By Inheritance
Trivium - The Crusade
Trivium - Ascendancy
Trivium - Shogun
Trivium - In Waves
Sadus - Swallowed in Black
Jerry Cantrell - Degradation Trip
The Great Kat - Beethoven on Speed
King Diamond - Abigail
Fear Factory - Soul of a New Machine
Fear Factory - Fear Is the Mindkiller
Fear Factory - Demanufacture
Fear Factory - Obsolete
Fear Factory - Digimortal
Fear Factory - Digital Connectivity
Fear Factory - The Best of Fear Factory
Fear Factory - Genexus
Slipknot - 9.0: Live
Slipknot - Vol. 3: (The Subliminal Verses)
Slipknot - Iowa
Slipknot - All Hope Is Gone
Resident Evil Soundtrack
Resident Evil: Apocalypse Soundtrack
Life of Agony - River Runs Red
Life of Agony - Ugly
Life of Agony - Soul Searching Sun
Disincarnate - Dreams of the Carrion Kind
Mercyful Fate - Melissa 25th Anniversary Re-Issue
Dååth - The Hinderers
Devildriver - Devildriver
Devildriver - The Fury of Our Maker's Hand
Devildriver - The Last Kind Words
Devildriver - Pray for Villains
Devildriver - Beast
Floodgate - Penalty
To My Surprise - To My Surprise
Type O Negative - World Coming Down
Type O Negative - Life is Killing Me
Type O Negative - The Best of Type O Negative
Machine Head - Burn My Eyes
Machine Head - The More Things Change...
Machine Head - Burning Red
Machine Head - Supercharger
Machine Head - The Blackening
Machine Head - Bloodstone & Diamonds
MTV2 Headbangers Ball
MTV2 Headbangers Ball, Vol. 2
MTV2 Headbangers Ball: The Revenge
Cavalera Conspiracy - Inflikted
Cavalera Conspiracy - Blunt Force Trauma
Gojira - L'Enfant Sauvage
Soulfly - Soulfly
Soulfly - Primitive
Soulfly - 3
Soulfly - Prophecy
Soulfly - Dark Ages
Soulfly - Conquer
Soulfly - Omen
Soulfly - Enslaved
Soulfly - Savages
Soulfly - Archangel
Roadrunner United
Malevolent Creation - Retribution
CKY - Carver City
Cynic - Focus
Dommin - Love Is Gone
Deicide - Legion
Deicide - Deicide
Deicide - The Best of Deicide
Freddy Vs. Jason Soundtrack
Coal Chamber - Coal Chamber
Coal Chamber - Chamber Music
Coal Chamber - Dark Days
Coal Chamber - Giving the Devil His Due
Coal Chamber - The Best of Coal Chamber
Madball - Best of Madball
Times of Grace - The Hymn of a Broken Man
Chimaira - The Impossibility of Reason
Sepultura - Beneath the Remains
Sepultura - Chaos A.D.
Sepultura - Roots
Sepultura - The Roots of Sepultura
Sepultura - Against
Sepultura - Nation
Sepultura - Under a Pale Grey Sky
Death - Symbolic
36 Crazyfists - Bitterness the Star
36 Crazyfists - A Snow Capped Romance
36 Crazyfists - Rest Inside the Flames
Wednesday 13 - Transylvania 90210: Songs of Death, Dying, and the Dead
Taking Dawn - Time to Burn
Obituary - The End Complete
Obituary - World Demise
Acidation - The Ivy
Acidation - The Lake Of Sorrow
Acidation - A Portal to the Past (Best Of Box Set)
Lynyrd Skynyrd - God & Guns
Stone Sour - Stone Sour
Stone Sour - Come What(ever) May
Stone Sour - Audio Secrecy
Stone Sour - House of Gold & Bones – Part 1
Opeth - Heritage
Dream Theater - Black Clouds & Silver Linings
Dream Theater - A Dramatic Turn of Events
Suicide Silence - You Can't Stop Me
Devilment - The Great and Secret Show
Killer Be Killed - Killer Be Killed
Anti-Mortem - New Southern
Black Star Riders - The Killer Instinct
Thy Art Is Murder - Holy War
Devil You Know - They Bleed Red
Willard - Steel Mill
Workhorse Movement - Sons of the Pioneers
downthesun - downthesun

References

External links
Interview, HitQuarters March 2009

American record producers
Living people
Year of birth missing (living people)
A&R people